Spring is the second album by American drummer Tony Williams recorded in 1965 and released on the Blue Note label. Williams is featured with tenor saxophonists Sam Rivers and Wayne Shorter, pianist Herbie Hancock and bassist Gary Peacock.

Reception
The Allmusic review by Al Campbell awarded the album 3 stars and stated "Considering the extraordinary talent assembled for Tony Williams' second Blue Note date as a leader, this could have been a landmark session. Unfortunately, it's not. Spring isn't totally forgettable; on the contrary... However, the five Tony Williams compositions... often failed to provoke the musicians into reaching crucial unity, making Spring haphazard, falling short of the expected goal".

Track listing
All compositions by Anthony Williams
Side one
 "Extras" – 8:10
 "Echo" – 5:02
 "From Before" – 6:50
Side two
 "Love Song" – 8:25
 "Tee" – 10:29

Personnel
Anthony Williams - drums
Wayne Shorter (1, 3, 5), Sam Rivers (1, 3-5) - tenor saxophone, flute
Herbie Hancock - piano (3-5)
Gary Peacock - bass (1 & 3-5)

References

Blue Note Records albums
Tony Williams (drummer) albums
1966 albums
Albums recorded at Van Gelder Studio
Albums produced by Alfred Lion
Instrumental albums